This is a list of episodes of the eighth season of Extreme Makeover: Home Edition.

Episodes

See also
 List of Extreme Makeover: Home Edition episodes
 Extreme Makeover: Home Edition Specials

Notes

References 

2010 American television seasons
2011 American television seasons